Altar Valley School District 51 is a public school district in Pima County, Arizona.

External links
 

School districts in Pima County, Arizona